The Pattaya Marathon is held every July in Pattaya, Chonburi Province, Thailand. It is organized by the City of Pattaya.

In 2018, the marathon had a total of 10,000 participants. The City of Pattaya plans to significantly improve the marathon in the coming years, in an attempt to rebrand Pattaya as a leading "sports city."

Past winners 
Key:

Marathon

Half marathon

Quarter marathon

References 

Pattaya Marathon results (2006-2018)

External links 

Marathons in Thailand